A Florentine biscuit (or simply, a Florentine) is a sweet pastry of nuts and fruit.

Florentines are made of nuts (typically hazelnuts and almonds) and candied cherries mixed with sugar melted together with butter and honey, cooked in an oven. They are often coated on the bottom with chocolate, which is traditionally scored in a wave pattern with the tines of a fork for decoration. Other types of candied fruit are used as well. They typically contain neither flour nor eggs.

See also 
List of cookies

References 

Biscuits
Nut confections
French confectionery